Blue Sky Green Field Wind Energy Center is a wind farm in northeast Fond du Lac County, Wisconsin. The  facility is located in the towns of Calumet and Marshfield. Owned by We Energies, it became the largest operating installation using wind power in Wisconsin when it came online in 2008.

History
An application for authorization to construct the Blue Sky Green Field Wind Farm was filed with the Public Service Commission of Wisconsin (PSCW) on March 17, 2006. On February 1, 2007, the PSCW issued the certificate of public convenience and necessity authorizing the project.

Construction on the farm began in June 2007 by Alliant Wind Connect at a cost of $300 million. Testing began in 2008, and the farm was placed in service on May 19, 2008.

Ongoing complaints about the infrasound have continued well after the wind park began operation.

Capacity
The wind farm consists of 88 Vestas Wind Systems V82 turbines, which have a capacity to produce 145 megawatts of power. They are expected to generate 328 million kilowatt hours annually, which is enough to power 36,000 homes. Each turbine is capable of production 1.65 megawatts of electricity.

Electricity production

See also

Wind power in Wisconsin
List of wind farms in the United States

References

External links
Fact Sheet from We Energies
Wind Farm Construction and Operation Video from We Energies

Energy infrastructure completed in 2008
Buildings and structures in Fond du Lac County, Wisconsin
Wind farms in Wisconsin